Johannes Vogel (born 29 April 1982) is a German politician of the Free Democratic Party (FDP) who has served as a member of the Bundestag from the state of North Rhine-Westphalia from 2009 until 2013 and since 2017.

Early life and education 
In 2001 Vogel graduated from high school. After his civil service as a paramedic in Wermelskirchen, he studied political science, history and public law at the University of Bonn from 2002. He completed his studies in 2009 with the Magister Artium (M.A.).

Political career 
From 2005 until 2010, Vogel served as chairman of the Young Liberals. He first became a member of the Bundestag in the 2009 German federal election. From 2009 until 2013, he served on the Committee on Labor and Social Affairs on the Parliamentary Advisory Board on Sustainable Development.

From 2014, Vogel worked with the Federal Employment Agency (BA). That same year, he became the Secretary General of the FDP in North Rhine-Westphalia, under the leadership of its chairman Christian Lindner. In this capacity, he managed the party's campaign ahead of the 2017 state elections. Following the elections, Vogel was responsible for labour and social affairs in the negotiations between Armin Laschet's CDU and the FDP on a coalition agreement.

In the 2017 national elections, Vogel was re-elected to the Bundestag. He has since been a member of the Committee for Labour and Social Affairs and a substitute member of the Committee on Foreign Affairs. He chairs the FDP parliamentary group's working group on labour and social affairs and serves as the group's spokesman for labour market and pension policy. 

In addition to his committee assignments, Vogel is part of the German-Chinese Parliamentary Friendship Group. In 2020, he joined the Inter-Parliamentary Alliance on China.

In 2019, Vogel took a leave of absence to be a John F. Kennedy Memorial Policy Fellow at Harvard University's Minda de Gunzburg Center for European Studies.

At the FDP's national convention in May 2021, Vogel was elected by delegates as one of three deputies of chairman Christian Lindner, succeeding Katja Suding.

Since 2022, Vogel has also been serving on the Committee on the Election of Judges (Wahlausschuss), which is in charge of appointing judges to the Federal Constitutional Court of Germany.

Other activities 
 Deutsche Renten Information (DRI), Member of the Advisory Board
 Human Rights Watch, Member

References

External links 

  
 Bundestag biography
 

 

1982 births
Living people
Members of the Bundestag for North Rhine-Westphalia
Members of the Bundestag 2021–2025
Members of the Bundestag 2017–2021
Members of the Bundestag 2009–2013
Members of the Bundestag for the Free Democratic Party (Germany)